Richard Wingfield, 6th Viscount Powerscourt (18 January 1815 – 11 August 1844), was a British peer and Conservative Party  politician.

Background
Powerscourt was the son of Richard Wingfield, 5th Viscount Powerscourt, and Frances Theodosia, daughter of Robert Jocelyn, 2nd Earl of Roden. Through the Wingfield line he was a descendant of the Noble House of Stratford. After the death of his mother in 1820, his father remarried Theodosia Howard, who raised him until he succeeded to his father's title 1823.

Political career
Powerscourt succeeded his father in the viscountcy in 1823. However, as this was an Irish peerage it did not entitle him to a seat in the House of Lords. He was instead elected to the House of Commons for Bath in 1837, a seat he held until 1841.

Family
Lord Powerscourt married his first cousin Lady Elizabeth Frances Charlotte, daughter of Robert Jocelyn, 3rd Earl of Roden, in 1836. They had three sons. He died in August 1844, aged 29, and was succeeded in the viscountcy by his son Mervyn, a great-great-grandfather of Sarah, Duchess of York. Lady Powerscourt married Frederick Stewart, 4th Marquess of Londonderry, in 1846.

References

Richard
1815 births
1844 deaths
Viscounts in the Peerage of Ireland
Conservative Party (UK) MPs for English constituencies
UK MPs 1837–1841
UK MPs who inherited peerages
Politics of Bath, Somerset